The Eyes That See in the Dark Demos is a demo version of the album by Barry Gibb. Originally circulating on tape among collectors and later also on CD the album saw a legitimate and wide release on iTunes in October 2006. Maurice Gibb contributed bass, guitar and synthesizer and Robin Gibb contributed background vocals on some songs in this demo album.

Recording sessions
Just after Barry contributing writing and producing songs for Dionne Warwick on her 1982 album Heartbreaker, Barry started to record "Eyes That See in the Dark" in August 1982, for Kenny Rogers, as Gibb and Rogers met later in the year and Rogers asked about some songs. But later in October 1982, the Bee Gees recorded "Life Goes On", as RSO Records publicly announced on 30 September that John Travolta would star in a sequel to Saturday Night Fever, to be directed by Sylvester Stallone, with new music by the Bee Gees. The film was called Staying Alive. Between November and December 1982, the Bee Gees recorded "Someone Belonging to Someone" and "I Love You Too Much", also for the film.

In January 1983, Barry continued to record songs for Rogers, the songs are "You and I", "This Woman" and "Midsummer Nights". Later in February, the Bee Gees recorded "Breakout" and "River of Souls" for the film. Also in February, Barry continued to record songs for Rogers' new album "Hold Me", "Living with You", "Buried Treasure" and "Islands in the Stream". The next month (March), the Bee Gees recorded "The Woman in You" (the last song recorded by the group for the film). In April 1983, the last recording sessions recorded by Barry for Rogers' album are "Saying Good-Bye", "Evening Star" and "I Will Always Love You".

In May 1983, Rogers started to record the album Eyes That See in the Dark and the album was released in August of that year.

Track listing

Personnel
 Barry Gibb — lead, harmony and background vocals, guitar
 Maurice Gibb — bass, synthesizer, guitar, background vocals
 Albhy Galuten — piano, synthesizer
 Robin Gibb — background vocals

References

Barry Gibb albums
2006 albums
Demo albums
Country albums by British artists